Eleni Andriana Glouftsis,  is an Australian rules football field umpire in the Australian Football League (AFL) and AFL Women's (AFLW). As of 25 September 2021, she has umpired in 51 AFL, and 4 AFLW matches.

She is the first female field umpire to officiate a match sanctioned by the AFL, which occurred in the 2016 NAB Challenge match between the Carlton Football Club and Essendon Football Club, played on 28 February 2016 at Princes Park.

She was congratulated by Malcolm Turnbull, the Australian Prime Minister.

On 1 November 2018 Eleni was awarded the Young South Australian of 2019, in a ceremony at the Adelaide Oval.

Glouftsis was awarded an Order of Australia Medal (OAM) in the 2021 Australia Day Honours, for "For service to Australian rules football, particularly as an umpire."

Umpiring career
Glouftsis commenced umpiring in 2008 with the North Eastern Metro Junior Football Association in Adelaide, South Australia, before commencing to umpire in the South Australian National Football League, umpiring her first senior SANFL match in August 2013, being the first female to officiate as a field umpire in a SANFL match.

She then moved to Melbourne on a three-year AFL Female Pathway scholarship at the end of 2014, where she umpired in 12 Victorian Football League matches during the 2015 VFL season, umpiring her first VFL match in June of that year. Glouftsis was also added to the AFL umpires rookie list as a field umpire at the beginning of the 2015 season, and trained with a dedicated coach within the AFL umpires group.

After officiating in two intra-club matches in the 2016 AFL pre-season, involving St Kilda and Essendon, she was appointed to her first AFL sanctioned match after what were described as "strong performances" by the AFL's National Umpiring Director, Wayne Campbell.

Personal life
Outside of umpiring she is a physical education teacher at St. Bernard's College, Melbourne. Both her parents were football umpires, and her partner, Dillon Tee, is also an AFL boundary umpire. In July 2019 Tee proposed to Glouftsis in the middle of the Melbourne Cricket Ground after they had both umpired the round 19 match between Carlton and Adelaide.

References

External links 

 Eleni Glouftsis at AFL Tables

Australian Football League umpires
Living people
Year of birth missing (living people)
Recipients of the Medal of the Order of Australia